Barfuiyeh (also Romanized as Barfūyeh) is a village in Sarbanan Rural District, in the Central District of Zarand County, Kerman Province, Iran. At the 2006 census, its population was 133, in 33 families.

References 

Populated places in Zarand County